Konopiska  is a village in Częstochowa County, Silesian Voivodeship, in southern Poland. It is the seat of the gmina (administrative district) called Gmina Konopiska.

The village has a population of 2,901.

References

Villages in Częstochowa County